Genevieve Pezet, born as Genevieve Beatrice White, and mononymously signed her work Genevieve (December 19, 1913 – January 23, 2009) was an American-born French artist, known for her paintings, ceramics, and sculptures. She was most active from around the 1940s until 2000.

Life 
Genevieve Beatrice White was born December 19, 1913, in Sandpoint, Idaho and she was raised in Troy, Montana. In 1928, she attended Washington State University in Pullman, Washington.

Pezet started painting while studying philosophy at Columbia University. She continued her studies at the Art Students League of New York, while teaching at the New York School of Interior Design. In 1947, she moved to Paris and she studied painting with André Lhote at the André Lhote Academy and sculpture with Ossip Zadkine in 1956 at the Académie de la Grande Chaumière. In 1948, she married Jacques Pezet at the Saint-Sulpice church in Paris. Together they had two sons.

In 1954, she participated in the Salon de la Jeune Sculpture at Musée Rodin.

She died in Pénestin, Morbihan in France, on January 23, 2009.

References

Additional reading 
 
 

1913 births
2009 deaths
20th-century American women artists
Art Students League of New York alumni
Columbia University alumni
People from Morbihan
People from Sandpoint, Idaho
Artists from Idaho
Washington State University alumni
21st-century American women
American emigrants to France